The Rhine leaves that part of Lake Constance known as the Upper Lake or Obersee as the Seerhein near Konstanz. After six kilometres it forms the Rheinsee, through which the river current flows. At its outflow is the island of Werd with its Franciscan monastery. The Rheinsee, together with the Zeller See and the Gnadensee, which surround the island of Reichenau, form the Untersee. The latter, together with the Seerhein, are considered part of Lake Constance.

In the specialist literature, however, it is also stated that the Rhine leaves Lake Constance at Konstanz. According to this proposition, the Untersee would be a separate lake. The Rheinsee forms the international border between Switzerland and Germany.

The eastern part of the Rheinsee is the Bay of Ermatigen (Ermatinger Bucht). The greatest depth of the Rheinsee, 45 metres, is simultaneously the deepest point of the entire Untersee.

At the outflow of the Rheinsee lies Stein am Rhein, a little town situated on either side of the river.

References 

Geography of Lake Constance